Shimsky District is an administrative and municipal district (raion), one of the twenty-one in Novgorod Oblast, Russia. It is located in the west of the oblast and borders with Batetsky District in the north, Novgorodsky District in the northeast, Starorussky District in the southeast, Volotovsky District in the south, Soletsky District in the southwest, Strugo-Krasnensky and Plyussky Districts, both of Pskov Oblast, in the west, and with Luzhsky District of Leningrad Oblast in the northwest. Its administrative center is the urban locality (a work settlement) of Shimsk. Population:  13,312 (2002 Census);  The population of Shimsk accounts for 33.1% of the district's total population.

Geography
The district is located west of Lake Ilmen, and a section of the western shore of the lake belongs to the district. The principal river within the limits of the district is the Shelon, which crosses the southern part of the district and forms an estuary. Shimsk is located on the left bank of the Shelon. Almost the whole area of the district lies in the basin of the Shelon. The biggest (left) tributary of the Shelon within the district is the Mshaga. Minor areas in the north of the district belong to the basin of the Luga River.

History
In the Middle Ages, the Shelon River played an important role as a part of the trade route connecting Novgorod with Pskov and further with the Narva River. In the end of the 15th century, the area was annexed, together with Novgorod, by the Grand Duchy of Moscow, where it was a part of Shelonskaya pyatina of Novgorod. In the course of the administrative reform carried out in 1708 by Peter the Great, it was included into Ingermanland Governorate (known since 1710 as Saint Petersburg Governorate). In 1727, separate Novgorod Governorate was split off. In the beginning of the 20th century, Shimsk, then known as Shimsky Perevoz, was the seat of Shimskaya Volost of Novgorodsky Uyezd of Novgorod Governorate.

In August 1927, the governorates and uyezds were abolished. The territory of modern Shimsky District was at the time divided between newly established Medvedsky (with the administrative center in the selo of Medved), Novgorodsky, Soletsky, and Starorussky Districts. Those districts were a part of Novgorod Okrug of Leningrad Oblast. On July 23, 1930, the okrugs were abolished, and the districts were directly subordinated to the oblast. On February 15, 1935, Shimsky District, with the administrative center in the selo of Shimsk, was established. It included parts of Novgorodsky, Soletsky, and Starorussky Districts. Between August 1941 and February 1944, Shimsky District was occupied by German troops. On July 5, 1944, Shimsky District was transferred to newly established Novgorod Oblast. In the course of the abortive administrative reform by Nikita Khrushchev, Shimsky District was abolished on February 1, 1963, with its territory split between Soletsky and Starorussky Rural Districts. Subsequently, the area was divided between Novgorodsky, Soletsky, and Starorussky Districts. On February 1, 1973, Shimsky District was re-established. On February 5, 1981, Shimsk was granted urban-type settlement status.

Another district established effective October 1, 1927 was Utorgoshsky District, which was a part of Luga Okrug of Leningrad Oblast and had its administrative center in the railway station of Utorgosh. It included parts of former Luzhsky Uyezd of Petrograd Governorate. On September 20, 1931, Utorgoshsky District was abolished and merged into Soletsky District. On February 15, 1935, it was re-established, and on July 5, 1944 transferred to newly established Novgorod Oblast. On December 10, 1962, the district was abolished and merged into Soletsky Rural District. After a number of administrative transformations, its territory ended up divided between Soletsky and Shimsky Districts.

Economy

Industry
Industry in Shimsky District includes food industry and flax textile production. In 2010, the flax factory, located in Utorgosh, was in crisis and had difficulties selling its production.

Agriculture
The main agricultural specializations in the district are the production of meat, milk, and eggs.

Transportation
Shimsk is located on the A116 highway which connects Veliky Novgorod and Porkhov (and continues to Pskov under a different code). It is also connected by roads with Luga, Staraya Russa, and Volot. There are local roads as well.

The Shelon is navigable within the district; however, there is no passenger navigation.

Culture and recreation

The district contains nine cultural heritage monuments of federal significance and additionally ninety-nine objects (one of them in Shimsk) classified as cultural and historical heritage of local significance. The federal monuments are the complex of the palace in the village of Korostyn built by architect Vasily Stasov, the Assumption Church, also in Korostyn, and an archeological site.

Notable residents 

Theofan of Poltava (1875–1940), archbishop, born Vassili Bystrov in Podmoshie

References

Notes

Sources

Districts of Novgorod Oblast
States and territories established in 1935
States and territories disestablished in 1963
States and territories established in 1973